Oriental Orthodoxy in Egypt represents Christians in Egypt who are adherents of Oriental Orthodoxy. In demographic terms, Oriental Orthodox Christians constitute the majority of Christians in Egypt.

The main denomination of Oriental Orthodoxy in Egypt is the Coptic Orthodox Church of Alexandria. The seat of the Pope of the Coptic Orthodox Church of Alexandria is currently occupied by Pope Tawadros II. Also, there are some 8000 Oriental Orthodox Armenians in Egypt and some 500 Oriental Orthodox Christians of the Syriac Orthodox Church.

See also
 Christianity in Egypt
 Eastern Orthodoxy in Egypt
 Roman Catholicism in Egypt
 Protestantism in Egypt
 Religion in Egypt
 Freedom of religion in Egypt
 Human rights in Egypt

References

Bibliography

External links
 European Centre for Law and Justice (2011): The Persecution of Oriental Christians, what answer from Europe?

 
Eastern Christianity in Egypt
Eastern Orthodoxy in Egypt